Nagnajów is the youngest osiedle of Tarnobrzeg, Podkarpackie Voivodeship,  Poland. The former village, located in extreme south of the town, was incorporated into Tarnobrzeg in 1976, and received the status of the osiedle in 1992. Nagnajow is an important road junction, with a 1960s Vistula river double bridge for rail and road traffic.

Districts of Tarnobrzeg